Browns Lake is a census-designated place (CDP) in Racine County, Wisconsin around a lake of the same name. The population was 1,879 at the 2020 census. It is politically a part of the town of Burlington, along with Bohners Lake.

Geography
Browns Lake is located at  (42.687609, -88.237143).

According to the United States Census Bureau, the CDP has a total area of 2.8 square miles (7.2 km2), of which, 2.2 square miles (5.6 km2) of it is land and 0.6 square miles (1.6 km2) of it (21.94%) is water.

Demographics

As of the census of 2000, there were 1,933 people, 745 households, and 545 families residing in the CDP. The population density was 892.6 people per square mile (343.9/km2). There were 975 housing units at an average density of 450.2/sq mi (173.5/km2). The racial makeup of the CDP was 96.53% White, 0.16% African American, 0.05% Native American, 0.88% Asian, 1.55% from other races, and 0.83% from two or more races. Hispanic or Latino of any race were 2.85% of the population.

There were 745 households, out of which 31.3% had children under the age of 18 living with them, 61.5% were married couples living together, 7.9% had a female householder with no husband present, and 26.8% were non-families. 21.5% of all households were made up of individuals, and 8.6% had someone living alone who was 65 years of age or older. The average household size was 2.51 and the average family size was 2.92.

In the CDP, the population was spread out, with 23.2% under the age of 18, 6.9% from 18 to 24, 28.8% from 25 to 44, 28.1% from 45 to 64, and 13.0% who were 65 years of age or older. The median age was 40 years. For every 100 females, there were 101.8 males. For every 100 females age 18 and over, there were 100.3 males.

The median income for a household in the CDP was $59,563, and the median income for a family was $65,714. Males had a median income of $44,940 versus $26,116 for females. The per capita income for the CDP was $28,368. None of the families and 1.3% of the population were living below the poverty line, including no under eighteens and 6.8% of those over 64.

References

Census-designated places in Racine County, Wisconsin
Census-designated places in Wisconsin